The IFAF Women's World Championship is the international championship for women in American football. The first event was held in 2010, in Stockholm, Sweden, with six countries competing. The United States took home the gold while not letting any team they played score. The second event was held in 2013, with Vantaa, Finland, hosting the games. The United States swept the competitors again, winning the gold medal. Third event was played in 2017 with Canada as the host nation. The U.S. took the gold medal for the third time, again beating the host nation Canada in the final.

In December 2018 IFAF announced that Finland will host the final tournament in 2021.

Results

Medal table

Participating nations
Legend
 – Champions
 – Runners-up
 – Third place
4–8 – 4th to 8th places.
 –  Qualified, but withdrew
 – Did not qualify
 – Did not enter or withdrew
 – Country did not exist or national team was inactive
 – host nation

See also

American football
Women's Football in the United States
American football in the United States
United States women's national American football team
National Football League

References

External links 
 International Federation of American Football IFAF
 IFAF Women's World Championship 2013

 
IFAF competitions
American football
Recurring sporting events established in 2010